The Rural Municipality of Coalfields No. 4 is a rural municipality (RM) in the Canadian province of Saskatchewan within Census Division No. 1 and  Division No. 1. Located in the southeast portion of the province, it is adjacent to the United States, neighbouring Burke County, North Dakota.

History 
The RM of Coalfields No. 4 was incorporated as a rural municipality on January 1, 1913.

Geography 
The Souris River is the only major river in the RM. It travels from Roche Percee in the west straight across to the east into the neighbouring RM of Enniskillen No. 3. There are no notable lakes in the RM of Coalfields.

Communities and localities 
The following urban municipalities are surrounded by the RM.

Towns:
Bienfait

Villages:
Frobisher
North Portal
Roche Percee

The following unincorporated communities are within the RM:
Deborah
Hirsch
Pinto
Taylorton

Transportation
The two major highways to travers the RM of Coalfields No. 4 are Highway 18 and Highway 39. Secondary highways include Highway 604, Highway 605, Highway 703, and Highway 704.

Demographics 

Government 
The RM of Coalfields No. 4 is governed by an elected municipal council and an appointed administrator that meets on the third Thursday of every month. The reeve of the RM is Richard Tessier while its administrator is Terry Sernick. The RM's office is located in Bienfait.

Gallery

See also 
List of rural municipalities in Saskatchewan
Coal mining in Saskatchewan

References

External links 

C

Division No. 1, Saskatchewan